The Latvia women's national football team is governed by the Latvian Football Federation (LFF). It played its first international match in August 1993 against Sweden.

After participating in the UEFA Women's Euro 1995 qualifying, Latvia withdrew from all qualification until the qualification for the European Championships in 2009. Latvia's record in international qualification games is poor. In their competitive games, Latvia lost their first two games, against Israel and Bosnia and Herzegovina by three goals, before losing by one goal to Armenia. Mini-tournaments after the qualification disaster proved no better for Latvia. Finishing last, in December 2008, Latvia lost 0–3 to Croatia and 0–5 to Turkey. Latvia won its first official match on 5 March 2011 over Lithuania in the qualifying 2013 European Championship preliminary round with a lone goal by Jūlija Sokolova. However, Latvia lost the other two games against Luxembourg and Macedonia so it didn't go through.

Results and fixtures

The following is a list of match results in the last 12 months, as well as any future matches that have been scheduled.
Legend

2022

Coaching staff

Current coaching staff

Manager history

 Viktors Lūkins (1992–1996)
 Grigorijs Rožkovs (1996–2003)
 Agris Bandolis (2003–2010)
 Didzis Matīss (2010–2021)
 Romāns Kvačovs (2021–present)

Players

Current squad
The following players have been called up for the match against North Macedonia and Northern Ireland on 1 and 6 September 2022.

Caps and goals are correct as of 22 August 2022.

Recent call ups
The following players have been called up to the Latvia squad in the past 12 months.

Records

*Active players in bold, statistics correct as of 19 August 2021.

Most capped players

Top goalscorers

Competitive record
FIFA Women's World Cup*Draws include knockout matches decided on penalty kicks.UEFA Women's Championship*Draws include knockout matches decided on penalty kicks.''

Women's Baltic Cup

See also

Sport in Latvia
Football in Latvia
Women's football in Latvia
Latvia women's national football team
Latvia women's national football team results
List of Latvia women's international footballers
Latvia women's national under-20 football team
Latvia women's national under-17 football team
Latvia men's national football team

Notes

References

External links
Official website
FIFA profile

 
European women's national association football teams
National